Julio Sabater (18 December 1926 in Ponce, Puerto Rico– 5 February 2003 in New York City, New York) was a Puerto Rican hurdler who competed in the 1948 Summer Olympics.

References

1926 births
2003 deaths
Puerto Rican male hurdlers
Sportspeople from Ponce, Puerto Rico
Olympic track and field athletes of Puerto Rico
Athletes (track and field) at the 1948 Summer Olympics
Central American and Caribbean Games gold medalists for Puerto Rico
Competitors at the 1950 Central American and Caribbean Games
Central American and Caribbean Games medalists in athletics